Ang Tanging Ina is a 2002 Filipino comedy film, starring Ai-Ai delas Alas and Eugene Domingo. The movie was the highest grossing Filipino film until it was surpassed by Sukob in 2006. Each film was produced or co-produced by Star Cinema.

The film's success spawned a television series of the same name and three sequels entitled Ang Tanging Ina N'yong Lahat, Ang Tanging Ina Mo (Last na 'To!), and Enteng ng Ina Mo.

The film references the story of a widowed mother who has 12 kids. And the social sacrifices of parenthood in a comedic and dramatic manner.

Plot
Ina Montecillo (Ai-Ai delas Alas) meets Tony (Edu Manzano), whom she considers "the man of her dreams". They both have four children, but Tony dies shortly after falling from a stool. Trying to find a replacement father for her children, she meets Alfredo (Tonton Gutierrez), and they have four more children. Alfredo dies after falling from a pedestrian overpass while fleeing with a crowd from a cinema due to false alarms shouted by an intoxicated patron, and Ina meets Kiko (Jestoni Alarcon), who fathers her other four children. On their wedding day, Kiko gets electrocuted and Ina decides to stop finding another husband.

One morning, Ina wakes up finding her children Juan (Marvin Agustin), Tudis (Nikki Valdez), Tri (Carlo Aquino), Por (Heart Evangelista), Pip (Alwyn Uytingco), Six (Marc Acueza), Seven (Shaina Magdayao), Cate (Serena Dalrymple), Shammy (Jiro Manio), Ten-Ten (Yuuki Kadooka), Connie and Sweet either troubled, problematic, panicking, fighting, or confused. Later on, she finds out that her family might go poor, and so works several jobs from construction to selling bootleg DVDs just to make ends meet.

She is reminded by Por of her début, while Juan begs her permission to let him find work. Ina agrees, but finds Juan's chores at home very confusing. Ina is told by her ex-driver Bruno, who reveals he is gay, that she can earn ₱2,000 a night at a strip club. Meanwhile, Juan meets his high school girlfriend Jenny (Kaye Abad) working at an amusement park, where he decides to apply. Tudis quits her job and tries to pursue her desired career as an artist. Tri tries to impress his girlfriend Gretchen (Angelica Panganiban) and her parents (Pinky Amador and Mandy Ochoa) with his intelligence. Por tries to convince her crush, Jeffrey (John Prats), to be escort her at her début. Pip, who is a closeted homosexual, spies on his crush doing his exercise routine. Six invites their mother to a mass and retreat while Seven was assigned to lead a school programme on Bakit Natatangi Ang Aking Ina ("Why My Mother Is Unique"). Sometime later, Shammy tries to protect his reputation of being uncircumcised when he becomes a victim of bullying by Nhel's brother. Pip prevents them from fighting and when Nhel arrives, he accidentally mentions that Shammy is uncircumcised, causing Shammy to hate him.

Things take a turn for the worse as Ina causes more problems for her kids: she prevents Juan from marrying Jenny, while Tudis refuses to help her in job-seeking. She exposes her life as a stripper to Tri, Gretchen, and Gretchen's parents, which causes Tri and Gretchen to split. She unsuccessfully fulfills Por's million-peso début and also learns that Pip is gay, then ruins Six's "church retreat" after thinking it was a "trick or treat" event. Seven hasn't told her of the programme yet because she doesn't want to be humiliated. Cate reveals that Ten-Ten is deaf and Shammy contracts a high fever after a circumcision by an unlicensed doctor. Finally, Ten-Ten goes missing. Ina rushes in a taxi to Shammy in hospital while still in her stripper outfit, causing her cabbie Eddie (Dennis Padilla) to fall in love with her. During their subsequent family meeting, she emotionally explains to the children that she took on several jobs not because it was her obligation, but because she loves them. Her complicated speech has the opposite effect, with Juan deciding to run away with Jenny. Rowena (Eugene Domingo) comforts the careworn Ina, who thinks of how to solve everything.

After quitting her job at the club, Ina takes a bus ride where she notices a suicide bomber in front her. She alerts the passengers and tells them to evacuate while she fights the bomber. Gaining the upper hand, Ina is able to jump out of the bus just in time as the bomb detonates, killing only the bomber while she sustains minor injuries upon landing. As news of the incident flashes on television, her family arrives at the hospital and mourns a corpse under a sheet. Ina, however emerges a few moments later in a wheelchair. She eventually fixes everything: she permits Juan, who returned, to date Jenny but not wed her; she convinces Tudis to get her job back and Gretchen to reunite with Tri; she accepts Pip's sexuality while Six forgives her; Seven finishes her programme; she forgives Shammy, who recovers from his infection, while she finds the still-deaf Ten-Ten in a local church.

Por meanwhile finally celebrates her début, and as Eddie snaps a photo of the Montecillos, the rocket in his back pocket ignites and sends him into the sky. Ina's voiceover explains that Eddie survived the explosion and they eventually married but they couldn't have anymore children after the rocket exploded in his trousers. In the end credits, the family is shown teaching Ten-Ten sign language together, so that he can communicate with the family.

Cast
Ai-Ai delas Alas as Ina Montecillo: Ina is the wife of Alfredo, Tony, Kiko, and Eddie, and is Juan, Tudis, Tri, Por, Pip, Six, Seven, Cate, Shammy, Ten-Ten, Connie and Sweet's mother. She is Rowena's best friend. She loves her children very much, and will do anything to fulfill their desires. She has worked as a construction worker, pirated DVD seller, vendor, stripper, and other jobs you can think of. She later becomes the savior of several passengers in a bus explosion. In the end, she solves all the problems of her children, and her children becomes proud of her once more. She also marries Eddie, but they can't have another child because of Eddie being involved in a fireworks accident.
Eugene Domingo as Rowena, Ina's best friend. She is very supportive towards her, and will do anything to make Ina happy.
Marvin Agustin as Juan Montecillo, Ina's first child. He has graduated from college, and is the helper of the family. When Juan reveals to his mother that he has proposed to Jenny, Ina scolds him, and he pleads Jenny to join him in escaping their families. In the end, Ina forgives him, and he and Jenny continued their relationship. Years later, they migrate to New Zealand for a new life.
Nikki Valdez as Gertrudis "Tudis" Montecillo: Tudis is Ina's second child. A college graduate, she was the only one in the family who was working. She then decides to quit her job, and pursues her desire to become an artist. In the end, she takes her job back, and is contented to be one of the helpers of her family. Years later, she migrates to Canada where she meets the man of her life.
Carlo Aquino as Dimitri "Tri" Montecillo: Tri is Ina's third child. He is a smart student in his college, and was dating Gretchen. But when Gretchen's parents figured out his mother was a stripper, Gretchen breaks up with him. This spoils him, and decides to drop out of school. In the end, Ina fixes their relationship, and he and Gretchen get back together. He also decides to continue his studies.
Heart Evangelista-Escudero as Portia "Por" Montecillo: Por is Ina's fourth child. She has a sassy personality along with a girly flair to her nature, and also has a crush on Jeffrey. She was the one giving her mother the heaviest problem of all, for she desires the "perfect début". In the end, she had her début, with her family and friends invited. She also decides to break up with Jeffrey years later, before migrating to Dubai as a missionary.
Alwyn Uytingco as Tirso "Pip" Montecillo: Pip is Ina's fifth child. He is secretly gay, and his family doesn't know it either. He is in love with Nhel. In the end, Ina accepts his personality, and he & Nhel begin dating.
Marc Acueza as Sixto "Six" Montecillo: Six is Ina's sixth child. He is a smart student, and is fond of declamations and orations. When he invites his mother to a church retreat, Ina misinterprets it as a "trick or treat" event, humiliating him. In the end, he forgives his mother. Years later, he migrates to United Kingdom to work there as a nurse.
Shaina Magdayao as Severina "Seven" Montecillo: Seven is Ina's seventh child. She is also an intelligent student, and is very fond of essays and programs. But when she becomes the leader of a program with the theme "Bakit Natatangi Ang Aking Ina (Why My Mother Is Very Special)", she becomes afraid Ina will humiliate her. In the end, she finishes the program, and becomes proud of her mother once more.
Serena Dalrymple as Catherine "Cate" Montecillo: Cate is Ina's eighth child. She is a bit of a tomboy, and doesn't attend her school frequently. She causes some of the problems of her siblings such as Six's retreat and Ten-Ten's disappearance.
Jiro Manio as Samuel "Shammy" Montecillo: Shammy is Ina's ninth child. He is a frequent target of bullying in his school due to him being uncircumcised. In order to avoid humiliation, Shammy takes matters to his own hands to be circumcised by an unlicensed doctor for PHP 50. This causes him to have high fever, another problem to the family. In the end, he says apologizes to his mother for being impatient, and later recovers.
Yuuki Kadooka as Martin "Ten-Ten" Montecillo, the deaf-mute tenth child of Ina. Cate horrifies Ina after telling her of his condition. He was also lost one morning, worrying his family. Later on, Ina finds him in the local church. Also in the end credits, his family teaches him the sign language to communicate with them.
Kaye Abad as Jenny, Juan's college girlfriend. Eventually, they become co-workers at an amusement park. Later on, Juan proposes to her, which she accepts. After Juan was scolded by his mother, they both escape their families and lived their own life. But after finding out Juan wasn't ready yet, they both decide to return to their respective homes. In the end, she and Juan continued their relationship. Years later, she and Juan migrated to New Zealand for a new life.
Angelica Panganiban as Gretchen, Tri's high school girlfriend. She comes from a rich family, wherein her parents gives the best for her. After her parents find out Ina was a stripper, she decides to break up with him. Later on, Ina pleads to her to continue her relationship with Tri. In the end, she and Tri get back together.
John Prats as Jeffrey, Por's high school crush. He also becomes Por's escort at her début. Years later, Por breaks up with him. In the second tanging ina, he became the boyfriend of Seven at first Ina doesn't agree with their relationship but comes to understand it in the end.
Dennis Padilla as Eduardo "Eddie" D. Montenegro, a taxi driver whom Ina met when Shammy was in the hospital. He was in love at first sight with Ina. He was later involved in a fireworks accident, damaging his bottom. He marries Ina, but because of the accident, they can no longer have another child.
Edu Manzano as Antonio "Tony" A. Montemayor, Ina's first husband. He is Juan, Tudis, Tri & Por's father. During a gamble, Tony is blocked by spectators. He stands on a stool, trying to see the two fighting spiders. He later outbalances, breaking his spinal cord & column.
Tonton Gutierrez as Alfredo B. Monteagudo, Ina's second husband. He is Pip, Six, Seven & Cate's father. He had a fatal fall from an overpass, breaking his back.
Jestoni Alarcon as Francisco "Kiko" C. Montecillo, Ina's third husband. He is Shammy, Ten-Ten, Connie & Sweet's father. During their wedding day, the bell's ribbons were electrified accidentally. Thus, when he pulled the ribbon, he was killed shortly.
Pinky Amador and Mandy Ochoa as Gretchen's parents. They are well-behaved, and will give anything for their daughter. At first, they liked Tri, but when they saw Ina as a stripper in the club, they convinced their daughter to break-up with Tri.

Uncredited:
Connie & Sweet Montecillo: Portrayed by twin baby girls, Connie & Sweet are minor characters in the film.

Release
Ang Tanging Ina was released on May 28, 2003.

On June 3, 2002, 500 moviegoers watching the film in one of the theaters at SM City Manila panicked and rushed outside the cinema when a scene that features a bus explosion coincided with the loud drilling of construction workers a floor below, causing audiences to assume that a bomb exploded in the building.

Sequel

In 2008, the Star Cinema brought the second installment of Ang Tanging Ina film series which still starred Ai-Ai de las Alas, Eugene Domingo, and several others. The film revolves around Ina (Ai-Ai de las Alas) who lately became the President of the Philippines and overturns the Philippines by ruling it into a whole new dimension of enjoyment which eventually causes her many serious problems about the country and with her family as well.

Ang Tanging Ina (TV series)

After the original film's phenomenal success, a TV sitcom was produced on ABS-CBN. It aired from August 17, 2003 to January 30, 2005, replacing Home Along Da Riles and was replaced by Goin' Bulilit. All of the actors who portrayed members of Ina's family return with the exception of Alwyn Uytingco who was replaced by Ketchup Eusebio. Also in the series, the family's last name was changed from Montecillo to Macaspac.

Cast
 Ai-Ai delas Alas as Ina Montecillo
 Marvin Agustin as Juan Montecillo
 Nikki Valdez as Getrudis "Tudis" Montecillo
 Carlo Aquino as Dimitri "Tri" Montecillo
 Heart Evangelista-Escudero as Portia "Por" Montecillo
 Ketchup Eusebio as Peter Tirso "Pip" Montecillo
 Marc Acueza as Sixto "Six" Montecillo
 Shaina Magdayao as Severina "Seven" Montecillo
 Serena Dalrymple as Catherine "Cate" Montecillo
 Jiro Manio as Samuel "Shammy" Montecillo
 Yuuki Kadooka as Martin "Ten-ten" Montecillo
 Eugene Domingo as Rowena
 Dennis Padilla as Eddie
 Roderick Paulate as Goliath, Ina's long-lost brother
 Tuesday Vargas as Kring-Kring
 John Estrada as Geronimo Madlang-tuta
 Archie Alemania as Richard
John Prats as Jeffrey, Portia's Boyfriend
Angelica Panganiban as Gretchen, Tri's Girlfriend
Anne Curtis as Barbie (Portia's friend)
Geoff Eigenmann as Portia's suitor
Alwyn Uytingco as Tirso "Pip" Macaspac (Guest Appearance)
Alma Moreno as Ness
Elizabeth Ramsey as Ina's Mother
Freddie Webb as Elvis, Ina's long lost Father
Edu Manzano as Tony/Alexander
Jestoni Alarcon as Kiko
Regine Velasquez as herself 
Maricel Soriano as Julia
Jericho Rosales
Dolphy as Kevin Cosme (Crossover Character from “Home Along Da Airport”)

See also
 Ang Tanging Ina (film series)
 Ang Tanging Ina N'yong Lahat
 Ang Tanging Ina Mo (Last na 'To!)
 Enteng ng Ina Mo
 List of programs broadcast by ABS-CBN

References

External links

2003 films
2000s Tagalog-language films
2003 comedy films
Star Cinema films
ABS-CBN original programming
Philippine television sitcoms
2003 Philippine television series debuts
2005 Philippine television series endings
Filipino-language television shows
Films directed by Wenn V. Deramas
Philippine comedy films